Zubieta is a surname. Notable people with the surname include:

Ángel Zubieta (1918-1985), Spanish footballer and manager
Carlos Goñi Zubieta (born 1963), Spanish philosopher, writer, and teacher
Roberto Alemán Zubieta (1921–2009), Panamanian lawyer, diplomat, politician, and businessman